CUCM may refer to:
 Cisco Unified Communications Manager, communications product from Cisco
 Master Chief Constructionman, a Seabee occupational rating in the U.S. Navy